Aleksandre Chivadze (born 8 April 1955 in Klukhori), is a former Georgian and Soviet football player and coach.

Chivadze spent his entire club career at FC Dinamo Tbilisi, playing from 1974 to 1987. He earned 46 caps for the Soviet Union national team and was included in the squads of the 1982 and 1986 World Cups. (In 1982 World Cup he was the captain of the Soviet team).

After retirement from playing he was head-coach of the Georgian national team from 1993 to 1997, and again from 2001 to 2003. On 31 January 2012, he became the head coach of the Georgia national under-21 football team.

Honours
Soviet Top League Champion: 1978
Soviet Cup Champion: 1976, 1979
UEFA Cup Winners' Cup Champion: 1981
 Soviet Footballer of the Year: 1980
U-21 UEFA Championship winner: 1980

External links
Profile in Russian
Aleksandr Gavrilovich Chivadze – International Appearances
 

1955 births
People from Karachay-Cherkessia
Living people
Soviet footballers
Footballers from Georgia (country)
Football managers from Georgia (country)
Footballers at the 1980 Summer Olympics
Olympic bronze medalists for the Soviet Union
Olympic footballers of the Soviet Union
1982 FIFA World Cup players
1986 FIFA World Cup players
Soviet Union international footballers
Soviet Top League players
FC Dinamo Tbilisi players
Georgia national football team managers
Olympic medalists in football
Honoured Masters of Sport of the USSR
Medalists at the 1980 Summer Olympics
Association football defenders